The question of the race of ancient Egyptians was raised historically as a product of the early racial concepts of the 18th and 19th centuries, and was linked to models of racial hierarchy primarily based on craniometry and anthropometry. A variety of views circulated about the racial identity of the Egyptians and the source of their culture. Some scholars argued that ancient Egyptian culture was influenced by other Afroasiatic-speaking populations in North Africa, the Horn of Africa or the Middle East, while others pointed to influences from various Nubian groups or populations in Europe. In more recent times some writers continued to challenge the mainstream view, some focusing on questioning the race of specific notable individuals such as the king represented in the Great Sphinx of Giza, native Egyptian pharaoh Tutankhamun, Egyptian Queen Tiye, and Greek Ptolemaic queen Cleopatra VII.

Mainstream scholars reject the notion that Egypt was a white or black civilization; they maintain that applying modern notions of black or white races to ancient Egypt is anachronistic. In addition, scholars reject the notion, implicit in the notion of a black or white Egypt hypothesis, that Ancient Egypt was racially homogeneous; instead, skin color varied between the peoples of Lower Egypt, Upper Egypt, and Nubia, who in various eras rose to power in Ancient Egypt. Within Egyptian history, despite multiple foreign invasions, the demographics were not shifted substantially by large migrations.

Origins 
In the 18th century, Constantin François de Chassebœuf, comte de Volney, in a set of comments regarding the race of the ancient Egyptians, wrote that "the Copts are the proper representatives of the Ancient Egyptians" due to their "jaundiced and fumed skin, which is neither Greek, Negro nor Arab, their full faces, their puffy eyes, their crushed noses, and their thick lips...the ancient Egyptians were true negroes of the same type as all native born Africans". Volney also said that the Sphinx gave him the key to the riddle as to why all the Egyptians he saw across the country "have a bloated face, puffed-up eyes, flat nose, thick lips – in a word, the true face of the mulatto." He wrote he was tempted to attribute it to the climate, but upon visiting the Sphinx, its appearance gave him the answer; "seeing that head, typically negro in all its features", Volney saw it as the "true solution to the enigma (of how the modern Egyptians came to have their 'mulatto' appearance)". He goes on to postulate, "the Copts were "true negroes" of the same stock as all the autochthonous peoples of Africa" and they "after some centuries of mixing..., must have lost the full blackness of its original color." Jacques Joseph Champollion-Figeac criticized Volney and called his conclusion "evidently forced and inadmissible".

The leading French scientist of the 18th century, Georges Cuvier, considered the Egyptians to be Caucasian, and it was with Cuvier that Augustus Granville sided in the dissection and first scientific autopsy of an ancient Egyptian mummy in 1825. Another early example of the controversy is an article published in The New-England Magazine of October 1833, where the authors dispute a claim that "Herodotus was given as authority for their being negroes." They point out with reference to tomb paintings: "It may be observed that the complexion of the men is invariably red, that of the women yellow; but neither of them can be said to have anything in their physiognomy at all resembling the Negro countenance."

In 1839, Jean-François Champollion stated in his work Egypte Ancienne that the Egyptians and Nubians are represented in the same manner in tomb paintings and reliefs, further suggesting that: "In the Copts of Egypt, we do not find any of the characteristic features of the ancient Egyptian population. The Copts are the result of crossbreeding with all the nations that successfully dominated Egypt. It is wrong to seek in them the principal features of the old race."

This memoir was made in the context of the first tribes that would have inhabited Egypt, his opinion was noted after his return from Nubia. In 1839, Champollion's and Volney's claims were disputed by Jacques Joseph Champollion-Figeac, who blamed a misunderstanding of the ancients for spreading a false impression of a "Negro" Egypt, stating "the two physical traits of black skin and woolly hair are not enough to stamp a race as negro" and "the opinion that the ancient population of Egypt belonged to the Negro African race, is an error long accepted as the truth. ... Volney's conclusion as to the Negro origin of the ancient Egyptian civilization is evidently forced and inadmissible."

Gaston Maspero, a 19th-century French Egyptologist, stated that "by the almost unanimous testimony of ancient Greek historians, they Ancient Egyptians belonged to the African race, which settled in Ethiopia." Heinrich Karl Brusch, a 19th-century German Egyptologist stated that "according to ethnology, the Egyptians appear to form a third branch of the Caucasian race... and this much may be regarded as certain". E.A. Wallis Budge, a 19th-century British Egyptologist, argued that "There are many things in the manners and customs and religions of the historic Egyptians that suggest that the original home of their ancestors was in a country in the neighbourhood of Uganda and Land of Punt".

The debate over the race of the ancient Egyptians intensified during the 19th century movement to abolish slavery in the United States, as arguments relating to the justifications for slavery increasingly asserted the historical, mental and physical inferiority of black people. For example, in 1851, John Campbell directly challenged the claims by Champollion and others regarding the evidence for a black Egypt, asserting "There is one great difficulty, and to my mind an insurmountable one, which is that the advocates of the negro civilization of Egypt do not attempt to account for, how this civilization was lost.... Egypt progressed, and why, because it was Caucasian." The arguments regarding the race of the Egyptians became more explicitly tied to the debate over slavery in the United States, as tensions escalated towards the American Civil War.

In 1854, Josiah C. Nott with George Glidden set out to prove "that the Caucasian or white, and the Negro races were distinct at a very remote date, and that the Egyptians were Caucasians." Samuel George Morton, a physician and professor of anatomy, concluded that "Negroes were numerous in Egypt, but their social position in ancient times was the same that it now is [in the United States], that of servants and slaves." In the early 20th century, Flinders Petrie, a professor of Egyptology at the University of London, in turn spoke of "a black queen", Ahmose-Nefertari, who was the "divine ancestress of the XVIIIth dynasty". He described her physically: "the black queen Ahmose Nefertari had an aquiline nose, long and thin, and was of a type not in the least prognathous". Petrie was a proponent of the dynastic race theory of the ancient Egyptians. He believed that a "master race" of invaders from the east, (i.e. Mesopotamia) was responsible for imposing civilisation on the "primitive" and "unsophisticated" indigenous Egyptians.

Position of modern scholarship 

Modern scholars who have studied ancient Egyptian culture and population history have responded to the controversy over the race of the ancient Egyptians in various ways.

At the UNESCO "Symposium on the Peopling of Ancient Egypt and the Deciphering of the Meroitic Script" in Cairo in 1974, the "Black Hypothesis" and the notion of a homogeneous population in Egypt was proposed by Cheikh Anta Diop in his chapter Origins of the Ancient Egyptians. "Numerous objections were made to the ideas propounded by Professor Diop. These objections revealed the extent of a disagreement which remained profound even though it was not voiced explicitly." The disagreement was largely due to methodological issues, for example, the insufficient data "to enable provisional conclusions to be drawn with regard to the peopling of ancient Egypt and the successive phases through which it may have passed". 

The arguments for all sides are recorded in the UNESCO publication General History of Africa, with the "Origin of the Egyptians" chapter being written by Cheikh Anta Diop, a proponent of the "Black Hypothesis". Diop's chapter was credited in the general conclusion of the symposium report by the International Scientific Committee's Rapporteur, Professor Jean Devisse, as a "painstakingly researched contribution", consequently there was a "real lack of balance" in the discussion among participants. At the 1974 UNESCO conference, several participants other than Diop and Obenga concluded that the Neolithic Egyptian population was indigenous to the Sahara, and was made up of people from north and south of the Sahara who had a range of skin colors. None of the participants voiced support for an earlier postulation that Egyptians were "white with a dark, even black, pigmentation."

Since the late 20th century, as the science of human population genetics has advanced, most biological anthropologists have come to reject the notion of race as having any validity in the study of human biology.

Frank J. Yurco outlined in a 1989 article that "In short, ancient Egypt, like modern Egypt, consisted of a very heterogeneous population". He also wrote in 1990: "When you talk about Egypt, it's just not right to talk about black or white .... To take the terminology here in the United States and graft it onto Africa is anthropologically inaccurate". Yurco added that "We are applying a racial divisiveness to Egypt that they would never have accepted, They would have considered this argument absurd, and that is something we could really learn from." Yurco wrote in 1996 that "the peoples of Egypt, the Sudan, and much of North-East Africa are generally regarded as a Nilotic continuity, with widely ranging physical features (complexions light to dark, various hair and craniofacial types)".

Gamal Mokthar, editor of the UNESCO General History of Africa, wrote in 1990 that "It is more than probable that the African strain, black or light, is preponderant in the Ancient Egyptian, but in the present state of our knowledge it is impossible to say more".

Egyptologist Miriam Lichtheim, in 1990, wrote that "The Egyptians were not Nubians, and the original Nubians were not black. Nubia gradually became black because black peoples migrated northward out of Central Africa".

Bernard R. Ortiz De Montellano wrote in 1993: "The claim that all Egyptians, or even all the pharaohs, were black, is not valid. Most scholars believe that Egyptians in antiquity looked pretty much as they look today, with a gradation of darker shades toward the Sudan".

Nancy Lovell wrote in 1999 that studies of skeletal remains indicate that the physical characteristics of ancient southern Egyptians and Nubians were "within the range of variation" for both ancient and modern indigenous peoples of the Sahara and tropical Africa, and that the distribution of population characteristics "seems to follow a clinal pattern from south to north", which may be explained by natural selection as well as gene flow between neighboring populations. Lovell outlined that "In general, the inhabitants of Upper Egypt and Nubia had the greatest biological affinity to people of the Sahara and more southerly areas". She also wrote that the archaeological and inscriptional evidence for contact between Egypt and Syro-Palestine "suggests that gene flow between these areas was very likely", and that the early Nile Valley populations were "part of an African lineage, but exhibiting local variation".

Stuart Tyson Smith wrote in 2001: "Any characterization of race of the ancient Egyptians depends on modern cultural definitions, not on scientific study. Thus, by modern American standards it is reasonable to characterize the Egyptians as 'black', while acknowledging the scientific evidence for the physical diversity of Africans." He continues: "Ancient Egyptian practices show strong similarities to modern African cultures including divine kingship, the use of headrests, body art, circumcision, and male coming of-age rituals, all suggesting an African substratum or foundation for Egyptian civilisation". Smith also wrote in 2004: "Egyptian art depicts Nubians with stereotypical dark skin, facial features, hairstyles, and dress, all very different from Egyptians and the other two ethnic groups, Asiatics and Libyans". He adds that "no single material correlate, no matter how abundantly represented, unambiguously reflects ethnic group affiliation".

Sonia Zakrzewski who wrote in 2003 studied skeletal samples from the Badarian period to the Middle Kingdom in Upper Egypt. The raw data suggested that the Ancient Egyptians in general had "tropical body plans" but that their proportions were actually "super-negroid", i.e. the limb indices are relatively longer than in many “African” populations. She proposed that the apparent development of an increasingly African body plan over time may also be due to Nubian mercenaries being included in the Middle Kingdom sample. Although, she noted that in spite of the differences in tibae lengths among the Badarian and Early Dynastic samples, that "all samples lie relatively clustered together as compared to the other populations". Zakrzewski concluded that the "results must remain provisional due to the relatively small sample sizes and the lack of skeletal material that cross-cuts all social and economic groups within each time period."

Donald B. Redford wrote in 2004 that: "The old notion of waves of "races" flowing up the Nile Valley, effecting cultural change and improvement, is now known to be as erroneous as it was simplistic. New ideas need not come by means of invasion: occasionally they are indigenous and may parallel similar discoveries elsewhere which are wholly unrelated."

Robert Morkot wrote in 2005 that "The ancient Egyptians were not 'white' in any European sense, nor were they 'Caucasian'... we can say that the earliest population of ancient Egypt included African people from the upper Nile, African people from the regions of the Sahara and modern Libya, and smaller numbers of people who had come from south-western Asia and perhaps the Arabian peninsula."

Barry J. Kemp wrote in 2007 that the black/white argument, though politically understandable, is an oversimplification that hinders an appropriate evaluation of the scientific data on the ancient Egyptians since it does not take into consideration the difficulty in ascertaining complexion from skeletal remains. It also ignores the fact that Africa is inhabited by many other populations besides Bantu related ("Negroid") groups. He wrote that in reconstructions of life in ancient Egypt, modern Egyptians would therefore be the most logical and closest approximation to the ancient Egyptians. Kemp also wrote that "..sample populations available from northern Egypt from before the 1st Dynasty (Merimda, Maadi and Wadi Digla) turn out to be significantly different from sample populations from early Palestine and Byblos, suggesting a lack of common ancestors over a long time" and the anthropological measurements of ancient Egyptians male limb length proportions had grouped "them with Africans rather than with Europeans".

Barbara Mertz wrote in 2011: "Egyptian civilization was not Mediterranean or African, Semitic or Hamitic, black or white, but all of them. It was, in short, Egyptian."

Kathryn Bard wrote in 2014: "Egyptians were the indigenous farmers of the lower Nile valley, neither black nor white as races are conceived of today".

Federico Puigdevall and ‎Albert Cañagueral wrote in 2017: "There are defenders of the theory that the pharaohs were black, and there are those who maintain they had Caucasian origins. Neither theory is provable".

Nicky Nielsen wrote in 2020: "Ancient Egypt was neither black nor white, and the repeated attempt by advocates of either ideology to seize the ownership of ancient Egypt simply perpetuates an old tradition: one of removing agency and control of their heritage from the modern population living along the banks of the Nile."

Marc Van De Mieroop wrote in 2021: "Some scholars have tried to determine what Egyptians could have looked like by comparing their skeletal remains with those of recent populations, but the samples are so limited and the interpretations so fraught with uncertainties that this is an unreliable approach". He concluded that ancient Egypt's "location at the edge of northeast Africa and its geography as a corridor between that continent and Asia opened it up to influences from all directions, in terms of both culture and of demography."

S.O.Y. Keita wrote in 2022 on the origins and the identity of the Ancient Egyptians. He examined various forms of evidence which included archaeology, historical linguistics and biological data to determine the population affinities. He concluded that “various disciplines indicate the groundings of Egypt within Northeastern Africa" and the ancient Egyptians “were a people and society that emerged in the Saharo-Nilotic region of Northeast Africa". Keita also reviewed studies on the biological affinities of the Ancient Egyptian population and wrote in 1993 that the original inhabitants of the Nile Valley were primarily a variety of indigenous Northeast Africans from the areas of the desiccating Sahara and more southerly areas. He also added that whilst Egyptian society became more socially complex and biologically varied, the “ethnicity of the Niloto-Saharo-Sudanese origins did not change”.

Academic views on bias in Egyptology/modern studies 
Various scholars have highlighted the role of colonial racism in shaping the attitudes of early Egyptologists, and criticised the continued over-representation of North American and European perspectives in the field. Diop in his work, "The African Origin of Civilization" argued that the prevailing views in Egyptology were driven by biased scholarship and colonial attitudes. Similarly, Bruce Trigger wrote that early modern scholarship on the Nile Valley populations had been "marred by a confusion of race, language, and culture and by an accompanying racism".

Christopher Ehret in 1996 wrote that "Ancient Egyptian civilization was, in ways and to an extent usually not recognized, fundamentally African. The evidence of both language and culture reveals these African roots. The origins of Egyptian ethnicity lay in the areas south of Egypt".

Stephen Quirke wrote in 2011 that the UNESCO-sponsored conference on the General History of Africa in 1974 "did not change the Eurocentric climate of research" and of the need to incorporate both African-centred studies and White European, academic perspectives. He later outlined that "research conferences and publications on the history and language of Kemet [Egypt] remain dominated ... by those brought up and trained in European, not African societies and languages (which include Arabic)".

Stuart Tyson Smith wrote in 2018 that a common practice among Egyptologists was to "divorce Egypt from its proper northeast African context, instead framing it as fundamentally part of a Near Eastern or “Mediterranean” economic, social and political sphere, hardly African at all or at best a crossroad between the Near East, the eastern Mediterranean and Africa, which carries with it the implication that it is ultimately not really part of Africa". He explicitly criticises Van De Mieroop's comments that ancient Egypt was clearly 'in Africa' it was not so clearly 'of Africa' as reflecting "long-standing Egyptological biases". He concluded that the interrelated cultural features shared between northeast African dynamic and Pharaonic Egypt are not "survivals" or coincidence, but shared traditions with common origins in the deep past".

Andrea Manzo wrote in 2022 that early Egyptologists had situated the origins of dynastic Egypt within a "broad Hamitic horizon that characterised several regions of Africa" and that these views had continued to dominate in the second half of the twentieth century. Manzo stated more recent studies had "pointed out the relevance of African elements to the rise of Egyptian culture, following earlier suggestions on Egyptian kingship and religion by Henri Frankfort" which countered the traditional view that considered Egypt "more closely linked to the Near East than to the rest of Africa".

Genetic studies have been criticised by several scholars for a range of methodological problems and providing misleading, interpretations on racial classifications. Boyce and Keita argued that certain studies have adopted a selective approach in sampling, such as using samples drawn mostly from northern (Lower) Egypt, which has historically had the presence of more foreigners from the Mediterranean and the Near East, and using those samples as representing the rest of Egypt. Thus, excluding the 'darker' south or Upper Egypt which presents a false impression of Egyptian variability. The authors also note that chromosomal patterns have featured inconsistent labelling such as Haplotype V as seen the with use of misleading terms like "Arabic" to describe it, implying this haplotype is of 'Middle Eastern' origins. However, when the haplotype V variant is looked at in context, it does have a very high prevalence in African countries above the Sahara and in Ethiopia.

In 2022, Danielle Candelora criticised how modern DNA studies are misused for political and racist agendas. As an example she cites the media echo about the Schuenemann genome study published in 2017, which was "sensationalized in the media as proof that Egyptians were not black Africans" in spite of its methodological limits, and taken by white suprematists as “scientific evidence” to justify their view on the achievements of the Ancient Egyptian civilisation. Candelora also noted that the media overlooked methodological limitations with the study such as the "untested sampling methods, small sample size, and problematic comparative data".

Present-day controversies 
Today the issues regarding the race of the ancient Egyptians are "troubled waters which most people who write about ancient Egypt from within the mainstream of scholarship avoid." The debate, therefore, takes place mainly in the public sphere and tends to focus on a small number of specific issues.

Tutankhamun 

Several scholars, including Diop, have claimed that Tutankhamun was black, and have protested that attempted reconstructions of Tutankhamun's facial features (as depicted on the cover of National Geographic magazine) have represented the king as "too white". Among these writers was Chancellor Williams, who argued that King Tutankhamun, his parents, and grandparents were black.

Forensic artists and physical anthropologists from Egypt, France, and the United States independently created busts of Tutankhamun, using a CT-scan of the skull. Biological anthropologist Susan Anton, the leader of the American team, said the race of the skull was "hard to call". She stated that the shape of the cranial cavity indicated an African, while the nose opening suggested narrow nostrils, which is usually considered to be a European characteristic. The skull was thus concluded to be that of a North African. Other experts have argued that neither skull shapes nor nasal openings are a reliable indication of race.

Although modern technology can reconstruct Tutankhamun's facial structure with a high degree of accuracy, based on CT data from his mummy, determining his skin tone and eye color is impossible. The clay model was therefore given a coloring, which, according to the artist, was based on an "average shade of modern Egyptians".

Terry Garcia, National Geographics executive vice president for mission programs, said, in response to some of those protesting against the Tutankhamun reconstruction: The big variable is skin tone. North Africans, we know today, had a range of skin tones, from light to dark. In this case, we selected a medium skin tone, and we say, quite up front, 'This is midrange.' We will never know for sure what his exact skin tone was or the color of his eyes with 100% certainty.... Maybe in the future, people will come to a different conclusion.

When pressed on the issue by American activists in September 2007, the Secretary General of the Egyptian Supreme Council of Antiquities, Zahi Hawass stated "Tutankhamun was not black."

In a November 2007 publication of Ancient Egypt magazine, Hawass asserted that none of the facial reconstructions resemble Tut and that, in his opinion, the most accurate representation of the boy king is the mask from his tomb. The Discovery Channel commissioned a facial reconstruction of Tutankhamun, based on CT scans of a model of his skull, back in 2002.

Stuart Tyson Smith, Egyptologist and professor of anthropology at University of California, Santa Barbara, in 2008 expressed criticism of the forensic reconstruction in a journal review, noting that “Tutankhamun’s face” was “very light-skinned” which reflected a “bias” among media outlets. He further added that “Egyptologists have been strangely reluctant to admit that the ancient Egyptians were rather dark-skinned Africans, especially the farther south one goes”.

In 2011, the genomics company iGENEA launched a Tutankhamun DNA project based on genetic markers that it indicated it had culled from a Discovery Channel special on the pharaoh. According to the firm, the microsatellite data suggested that Tutankhamun belonged to the haplogroup R1b1a2, the most common paternal clade among males in Western Europe. Carsten Pusch and Albert Zink, who led the unit that had extracted Tutankhamun's DNA, chided iGENEA for not liaising with them before establishing the project. After examining the footage, they also concluded that the methodology the company used was unscientific with Putsch calling them "simply impossible".

A 2020 DNA study by Gad, Hawass et al., analysed mitochondrial and Y-chromosomal haplogroups from Tutankhamun's family members of the 18th Dynasty, using comprehensive control procedures to ensure quality results. They found that the Y-chromosome haplogroup of the family was R1b, which originated in Europe and which today makes up 50–90% of the genetic pool of modern western Europeans. The mitochondrial haplogroup was K, which is most likely also part of a Near Eastern lineage. The profiles for Tutankhamun and Amenhotep III were incomplete and the analysis produced differing probability figures despite having concordant allele results.

Because the relationships of these two mummies with the KV55 mummy had previously been confirmed in an earlier study, the haplogroup prediction of both mummies could be derived from the full profile of the KV55 data. The 20th Dynasty pair of Ramesses III and his son were found to have the haplogroup E1b1a, which has its highest frequencies in modern populations from West Africa and Central Africa, but which is rare among North Africans and nearly absent in East Africa.
Genetic analysis indicated the following haplogroups:
 Amenhotep III YDNA R1b / mtDNA H2b
 Tutankhamun YDNA R1b / mtDNA K
 Akhenaten YDNA R1b / mtDNA K
 Tiye mtDNA K
 Yuya G2a / mtDNA K
 Thuya mtDNA K

In 2010 Hawass et al. undertook detailed anthropological, radiological, and genetic studies as part of the King Tutankhamun Family Project. The objectives included attempting to determine familial relationships among 11 royal mummies of the New Kingdom, as well to research for pathological features including potential inherited disorders and infectious diseases. In 2022, S.O.Y. Keita analysed 8 Short Tandem loci (STR) data published as part of these studies by Hawass et al., using an algorithm that only has three choices: Eurasians, sub-Saharan Africans, and East Asians. Using these three options, Keita concluded that the studies showed "a majority to have an affinity with "sub-Saharan" Africans in one affinity analysis". However, Keita cautioned that this does not mean that the royal mummies “lacked other affiliations” which he argued had been obscured in typological thinking. Keita further added that different “data and algorithms might give different results” which reflects the complexity of biological heritage and the associated interpretation.

Cleopatra 
The race and skin color of Cleopatra VII, the last active Hellenistic ruler of the Macedonian Greek Ptolemaic dynasty of Egypt, established in 323 BC, has also caused some debate, although generally not in scholarly sources. For example, the article "Was Cleopatra Black?" was published in Ebony magazine in 2012, and an article about Afrocentrism from the St. Louis Post-Dispatch mentions the question, too. Mary Lefkowitz, Professor Emerita of Classical Studies at Wellesley College, traces the main origins of the black Cleopatra claim to the 1946 book by J. A. Rogers called World's Great Men of Color, although noting that the idea of Cleopatra as black goes back to at least the 19th century.

Lefkowitz refutes Rogers' hypothesis, on various scholarly grounds. The black Cleopatra claim was further revived in an essay by afrocentrist John Henrik Clarke, chair of African history at Hunter College, entitled "African Warrior Queens." Lefkowitz notes the essay includes the claim that Cleopatra described herself as black in the New Testament's Book of Acts – when in fact Cleopatra had died more than sixty years before the death of Jesus Christ.

Scholars identify Cleopatra as essentially of Greek ancestry with some Persian and Syrian ancestry, based on the fact that her Macedonian Greek family (the Ptolemaic dynasty) had intermingled with the Seleucid aristocracy of the time. Grant states that Cleopatra probably had not a drop of Egyptian blood and that she "would have described herself as Greek." Roller notes that "there is absolutely no evidence" that Cleopatra was racially black African as claimed by what he dismisses as generally not "credible scholarly sources." Cleopatra's official coinage (which she would have approved) and the three portrait busts of her which are considered authentic by scholars, all match each other, and they portray Cleopatra as a Greek woman. Polo writes that Cleopatra's coinage presents her image with certainty, and asserts that the sculpted portrait of the "Berlin Cleopatra" head is confirmed as having a similar profile.

In 2009, a BBC documentary speculated that Cleopatra might have been part North African. This was based largely on the claims of Hilke Thür of the Austrian Academy of Sciences, who in the 1990s had examined a headless skeleton of a female child in a 20 BC tomb in Ephesus (modern Turkey), together with the old notes and photographs of the now-missing skull. Thür hypothesized the body as that of Arsinoe, half-sister to Cleopatra. Arsinoe and Cleopatra shared the same father (Ptolemy XII Auletes) but had different mothers, with Thür claiming the alleged African ancestry came from the skeleton's mother.

To date it has never been definitively proved that the skeleton is that of Arsinoe IV. When a DNA test attempted to determine the identity of the child, it was impossible to get an accurate reading since the bones had been handled too many times, and the skull had been lost in Germany during World War II. Numerous studies have shown that cranial variation has a low correlation with race, and rather that cranial variation was strongly correlated with climate variables. Mary Beard states that the age of the skeleton is too young to be that of Arsinoe (the bones said to be that of a 15–18-year-old child, with Arsinoe being around her mid twenties at her death).

Great Sphinx of Giza 

The identity of the model for the Great Sphinx of Giza is unknown. Most experts believe that the face of the Sphinx represents the likeness of the Pharaoh Khafra, although a few Egyptologists and interested amateurs have proposed different hypotheses.

An early description of the Sphinx, "typically negro in all its features", is recorded in the travel notes of a French scholar, Volney, who visited Egypt between 1783 and 1785 along with French novelist Gustave Flaubert. A similar description was given in the "well-known book" by Vivant Denon, where he described the sphinx as "the character is African; but the mouth, the lips of which are thick." Following Volney, Denon, and other early writers, numerous Afrocentric scholars, such as Du Bois, Diop and Asante have characterized the face of the Sphinx as Black, or "Negroid".

American geologist Robert M. Schoch has written that the "Sphinx has a distinctive African, Nubian, or Negroid aspect which is lacking in the face of Khafre". but he was described by others such as Ronald H. Fritze and Mark Lehner of being a "pseudoscientific writer". David S. Anderson writes in Lost City, Found Pyramid: Understanding Alternative Archaeologies and Pseudoscientific Practices that Van Sertima's claim that "the sphinx was a portrait statue of the black pharaoh Khafre" is a form of "pseudoarchaeology" not supported by evidence. He compares it to the claim that Olmec colossal heads had "African origins", which is not taken seriously by Mesoamerican scholars such as Richard Diehl and Ann Cyphers.

Kemet 

A review of David Goldenberg's The Curse of Ham: Race and Slavery in Early Judaism, Christianity and Islam states that Goldenberg "argues persuasively that the biblical name Ham bears no relationship at all to the notion of blackness and as of now is of unknown etymology". Diop, William Leo Hansberry, and Aboubacry Moussa Lam have argued that kmt was derived from the skin color of the Nile valley people, which Diop claimed was black. The claim that the ancient Egyptians had black skin has become a cornerstone of Afrocentric historiography.

Mainstream scholars hold that  means "the black land" or "the black place", and that this is a reference to the fertile black soil that was washed down from Central Africa by the annual Nile inundation. By contrast the barren desert outside the narrow confines of the Nile watercourse was called  (conventionally pronounced deshret) or "the red land". Raymond Faulkner's Concise Dictionary of Middle Egyptian translates kmt into "Egyptians", Gardiner translates it as "the Black Land, Egypt".

At the UNESCO Symposium in 1974, Sauneron, Obenga, and Diop concluded that KMT and KM meant black. However, Sauneron clarified that the adjective Kmtyw means "people of the black land" rather than "black people", and that the Egyptians never used the adjective Kmtyw to refer to the various black peoples they knew of, they only used it to refer to themselves.

Ancient Egyptian art 

Ancient Egyptian tombs and temples contained thousands of paintings, sculptures, and written works, which reveal a great deal about the people of that time. However, their depictions of themselves in their surviving art and artifacts are rendered in sometimes symbolic, rather than realistic, pigments. As a result, ancient Egyptian artifacts provide sometimes conflicting and inconclusive evidence of the ethnicity of the people who lived in Egypt during dynastic times.

In their own art, "Egyptians are often represented in a color that is officially called dark red", according to Diop. Arguing against other theories, Diop quotes Champollion-Figeac, who states, "one distinguishes on Egyptian monuments several species of blacks, differing...with respect to complexion, which makes Negroes black or copper-colored." Regarding an expedition by King Sesostris, Cherubini states the following concerning captured southern Africans, "except for the panther skin about their loins, are distinguished by their color, some entirely black, others dark brown.

University of Chicago scholars assert that Nubians are generally depicted with black paint, but the skin pigment used in Egyptian paintings to refer to Nubians can range "from dark red to brown to black". This can be observed in paintings from the tomb of the Egyptian Huy, as well as Ramses II's temple at Beit el-Wali. Also, Snowden indicates that Romans had accurate knowledge of "negroes of a red, copper-colored complexion ... among African tribes".

Stuart Tyson Smith, Egyptologist and professor of anthropology at University of California, Santa Barbara, wrote in 2001 that "The scene of an expedition to Punt from Queen Hatshepsuis mortuary complex at Deir el-Bahri shows Puntites with red skin and facial features similar to Egyptians, long or bobbed hair, goatee beards, and kilts".

Conversely, in 2003 Najovits wrote that "Egyptian art depicted Egyptians on the one hand and Nubians and other blacks on the other hand with distinctly different ethnic characteristics and depicted this abundantly and often aggressively. The Egyptians accurately, arrogantly and aggressively made national and ethnic distinctions from a very early date in their art and literature." He continues, "There is an extraordinary abundance of Egyptian works of art which clearly depicted sharply contrasted reddish-brown Egyptians and black Nubians."

In 2003, David O’Connor and Andrew Reid remarked that “Puntite and Egyptian males are assigned similarly reddish skins, but Nubians typically have darker one, and Libyans at most periods have light coloured, yellowish skin. Initially, Nubians and Puntities may have been shown as fairly similar in appearance and dress (short linen kilts), but by ca 1400 BC they are distinctly different”.

Barbara Mertz in 2011 wrote in Red Land, Black Land: Daily Life in Ancient Egypt: "The concept of race would have been totally alien to them [Ancient Egyptians] ...The skin color that painters usually used for men is a reddish brown. Women were depicted as lighter in complexion, perhaps because they didn't spend so much time out of doors. Some individuals are shown with black skins. I cannot recall a single example of the words “black,” “brown,” or “white” being used in an Egyptian text to describe a person." She gives the example of one of Thutmose III's "sole companions", who was Nubian or Kushite. In his funerary scroll, he is shown with dark brown skin instead of the conventional reddish brown used for Egyptians.

Table of Nations controversy 

However, Manu Ampim, a professor at Merritt College specializing in African and African American history and culture, claims in the book Modern Fraud: The Forged Ancient Egyptian Statues of Ra-Hotep and Nofret, that many ancient Egyptian statues and artworks are modern frauds that have been created specifically to hide the "fact" that the ancient Egyptians were black, while authentic artworks that demonstrate black characteristics are systematically defaced or even "modified". Ampim repeatedly makes the accusation that the Egyptian authorities are systematically destroying evidence that "proves" that the ancient Egyptians were black, under the guise of renovating and conserving the applicable temples and structures. He further accuses "European" scholars of wittingly participating in and abetting this process.

Ampim has a specific concern about the painting of the "Table of Nations" in the Tomb of Ramesses III (KV11). The "Table of Nations" is a standard painting that appears in a number of tombs, and they were usually provided for the guidance of the soul of the deceased. Among other things, it described the "four races of men" as follows: (translation by E.A. Wallis Budge) "The first are RETH, the second are AAMU, the third are NEHESU, and the fourth are THEMEHU. The RETH are Egyptians, the AAMU are dwellers in the deserts to the east and north-east of Egypt, the NEHESU are the black races, and the THEMEHU are the fair-skinned Libyans."

The archaeologist Karl Richard Lepsius documented many ancient Egyptian tomb paintings in his work Denkmäler aus Aegypten und Aethiopien. In 1913, after the death of Lepsius, an updated reprint of the work was produced, edited by Kurt Sethe. This printing included an additional section, called the "Ergänzungsband" in German, which incorporated many illustrations that did not appear in Lepsius' original work. One of them, plate 48, illustrated one example of each of the four "nations" as depicted in KV11, and shows the "Egyptian nation" and the "Nubian nation" as identical to each other in skin color and dress. Professor Ampim has declared that plate 48 is a true reflection of the original painting, and that it "proves" that the ancient Egyptians were identical in appearance to the Nubians, even though he admits no other examples of the "Table of Nations" show this similarity. He has further accused "Euro-American writers" of attempting to mislead the public on this issue.

The late Egyptologist Frank J. Yurco visited the tomb of Ramesses III (KV11), and in a 1996 article on the Ramesses III tomb reliefs he pointed out that the depiction of plate 48 in the Ergänzungsband section is not a correct depiction of what is actually painted on the walls of the tomb. Yurco notes, instead, that plate 48 is a "pastiche" of samples of what is on the tomb walls, arranged from Lepsius' notes after his death, and that a picture of a Nubian person has erroneously been labeled in the pastiche as an Egyptian person. Yurco points also to the much more recent photographs of Dr. Erik Hornung as a correct depiction of the actual paintings. (Erik Hornung, The Valley of the Kings: Horizon of Eternity, 1990).

Yurco later concluded that Egyptian iconography reflected "various complexions" and that "current scholarship in Egyptology, not acknowledged often by Afrocentrists, has demonstrated that the Egyptians were most closely related to Saharan Africans, culturally and linguistically, and that such Mesopotamian influence can be inferred, came through the Nile Delta town of Buto, as part of long-distance trade". He also noted that the Egyptians made distinctions between groups from Nubia, such as "Nhsy" and "Mdja" with the former group described as "darker, with frizzy hair and wore a distinctive dress". Ampim nonetheless continues to argue that plate 48 shows accurately the images that stand on the walls of KV11, and he categorically accuses both Yurco and Hornung of perpetrating a deliberate deception for the purposes of misleading the public about the true race of the ancient Egyptians.

Fayyum mummy portraits 

The Roman era Fayum mummy portraits attached to coffins containing the latest dated mummies discovered in the Faiyum Oasis represent a population of both native Egyptians and those with mixed Greek heritage. The dental morphology of the mummies align more with the indigenous North African population than Greek or other later colonial European settlers.

Black queen controversy 
The late British Africanist Basil Davidson stated "Whether the Ancient Egyptians were as black or as brown in skin color as other Africans may remain an issue of emotive dispute; probably, they were both. Their own artistic conventions painted them as pink, but pictures on their tombs show they often married queens shown as entirely black being from the south."

Ahmose-Nefertari is an example. In most depictions of Ahmose-Nefertari, she is pictured with black skin, while in some instances her skin is blue or red. In 1939 Flinders Petrie said "an invasion from the south...established a black queen as the divine ancestress of the XVIIIth dynasty" He also said "a possibility of the black being symbolic has been suggested" and "Nefertari must have married a Libyan, as she was the mother of Amenhetep I, who was of fair Libyan style."

In 1961 Alan Gardiner, in describing the walls of tombs in the Deir el-Medina area, noted in passing that Ahmose-Nefertari was "well represented" in these tomb illustrations, and that her countenance was sometimes black and sometimes blue. He did not offer any explanation for these colors, but noted that her probable ancestry ruled out that she might have had black blood. In 1974, Diop described Ahmose-Nefertari as "typically negroid." In the controversial book Black Athena, the hypotheses of which have been widely rejected by mainstream scholarship, Martin Bernal considered her skin color in paintings to be a clear sign of Nubian ancestry. In 1981 Michel Gitton noted that while in most artistic depictions of the queen she is pictured with black complexion, there are other cases in which she is shown with a pink, golden, blue, or dark red skin color.

Gitton called the issue of Ahmose-Nefertari's black color "a serious gap in the Egyptological research, which allows approximations or untruths". He pointed out that there is no known depiction of her painted during her lifetime (she is represented with the same light skin as other represented individuals in tomb TT15, before her deification); the earliest black skin depiction appears in tomb TT161, circa 150 years after her death. Barbara Lesko wrote in 1996 that Ahmose-Nefertari was "sometimes portrayed by later generations as having been black, although her coffin portrait gives her the typical light yellow skin of women."

In 2003, Betsy Bryan wrote in The Oxford History of Ancient Egypt that "the factors linking Amenhotep I and his mother with the necropolis region, with deified rulers, and with rejuvenation generally was visually transmitted by representations of the pair with black or blue skin – both colours of resurrection." In 2004 Aidan Dodson and Dyan Hilton recognized in a later depiction of the queen, "the black skin of a deity of resurrection" in connection to her role as a patron goddess of the Theban necropolis. Scholars such as Joyce Tyldesley, Sigrid Hodel-Hoenes, and Graciela Gestoso Singer, argued that the skin color of Ahmose-Nefertari is indicative of her role as a goddess of resurrection, since black is both the color of the fertile land of Egypt and that of Duat, the underworld.

Singer recognizes that "Some scholars have suggested that this is a sign of Nubian ancestry." Singer also states a statuette of Ahmose-Nefertari at the Museo Egizio in Turin which shows her with a black face, though her arms and feet are not darkened, thus suggesting that the black coloring has an iconographic motive and does not reflect her actual appearance. In 2014, Margaret Bunson wrote that "the unusual depictions of Ahmose-Nefertari in blue-black tones of deification reflect her status and cult." In a wooden votive statue of Ahmose-Nefertari, currently in the Louvre museum, her skin was painted red, a color commonly seen symbolizing life or a higher being, or elevated status.

Historical hypotheses 
Since the second half of the 20th century, typological and hierarchical models of race have increasingly been rejected by scientists, and most scholars have held that applying modern notions of race to ancient Egypt is anachronistic. The current position of modern scholarship is that the Egyptian civilization was an indigenous Nile Valley development (see population history of Egypt). At the UNESCO symposium in 1974, several participants concluded that the ancient Egyptian population was indigenous to the Nile Valley, and was made up of people from north and south of the Sahara who were differentiated by their color.

Black Egyptian hypothesis 

The Black Egyptian hypothesis is the hypothesis that ancient Egypt was a "Black", homogeneous civilization. Although there is consensus that Ancient Egypt was indigenous to Africa, the hypothesis that it was a "Black", homogeneous civilization was met with "profound" disagreement, by some UNESCO scholars in 1974 due to the insufficient data “to enable provisional conclusions to be drawn with regard to the peopling of ancient Egypt and the successive phases through which it may have passed” and currently because it rests upon a scientifically outdated conception of race. Although, the archaeological evidence "strongly supports an African origin" for the ancient Egyptians.
 
The Black Egyptian hypothesis includes a particular focus on links to Sub Saharan cultures and the questioning of the race of specific notable individuals from Dynastic times, including Tutankhamun the person represented in the Great Sphinx of Giza, and the Greek Ptolemaic queen Cleopatra. Advocates of the Black African model rely heavily on writings from Classical Greek historians, including Strabo, Diodorus Siculus, Ammianus Marcellinus, and Herodotus. Advocates claim that these "classical" authors referred to Egyptians as "Black with woolly hair".

The Greek word used was "melanchroes", and the English language translation of this Greek word is disputed, being translated by many as "dark skinned" and by many others as "black". Diop said "Herodotus applied melanchroes to both Ethiopians and Egyptians...and melanchroes is the strongest term in Greek to denote blackness." According to Alan B. Lloyd there is no linguistic justification for relating Herodotus' description to Black Africans. Snowden claims that Diop is distorting his classical sources and is quoting them selectively. Snowden has also acknowledged that "both Egyptians and Ethiopians were described as black, but only Ethiopians were described as having exceedingly woolly hair".

Keita specified that the historical accounts of the ancient Greeks were of limited value as “they were not working within modern science” and it remained unclear if distinctions between Egyptians and Ethiopians were cultural rather than biological at certain times. He also added that “some Greeks reported that Egypt was an Ethiopian colony”. There is dispute about the historical accuracy of the works of Herodotus – some scholars support the reliability of Herodotus while other scholars regard his works as being unreliable as historical sources, particularly those relating to Egypt.

Other claims used to support the Black Hypothesis included anthropological measurements of Egyptian mummies, testing melanin levels in a small sample of mummies, language affinities between ancient Egyptian language and sub-saharan languages, interpretations of the origin of the name Kmt, conventionally pronounced Kemet, used by the ancient Egyptians to describe themselves or their land (depending on points of view), biblical traditions, shared B blood group between Egyptians and West Africans, and interpretations of the depictions of the Egyptians in numerous paintings and statues.

The hypothesis also claimed cultural affiliations, such as circumcision, matriarchy, totemism, hair braiding, head binding, and kingship cults. Artifacts found at Qustul (near Abu Simbel – Modern Sudan) in 1960–64 were seen as showing that ancient Egypt and the A-Group culture of Nubia shared the same culture and were part of the greater Nile Valley sub-stratum, but more recent finds in Egypt indicate that the Qustul rulers probably adopted/emulated the symbols of Egyptian pharaohs. Authors and critics state the hypothesis is primarily adopted by Afrocentrists. The archaeological cemeteries at Qustul are no longer available for excavations since the flooding of Lake Nasser. According to David Wengrow, the A-Group polity of the late 4th millenninum BCE is poorly understood since most of the archaeological remains are submerged underneath Lake Nasser.   

The current position of modern scholarship is that the Egyptian civilization was an indigenous Nile Valley development (see population history of Egypt), and that modern racial categories like "Black" are social constructs inapplicable to Ancient Egypt.

Asiatic race theory 
This theory was the most dominant view from the Early Middle Ages (c. 500 AD) until the early 19th century. The descendants of Ham were traditionally considered to be the darkest-skinned branch of humanity, either because of their geographic allotment to Africa or because of the Curse of Ham. Thus, Diop cited Gaston Maspero "Moreover, the Bible states that Mesraim, son of Ham, brother of Chus (Kush) ... and of Canaan, came from Mesopotamia to settle with his children on the banks of the Nile."

By the 20th century, the Asiatic race theory and its various offshoots were abandoned but were superseded by two related theories: the Eurocentric Hamitic hypothesis, asserting that a Caucasian racial group moved into North and East Africa from early prehistory subsequently bringing with them all advanced agriculture, technology and civilization, and the Dynastic race theory, proposing that Mesopotamian invaders were responsible for the dynastic civilization of Egypt (c. 3000 BC). In sharp contrast to the Asiatic race theory, neither of these theories proposes that Caucasians were the indigenous inhabitants of Egypt.

At the UNESCO "Symposium on the Peopling of Ancient Egypt and the Deciphering of the Meroitic Script" in Cairo in 1974, none of the participants explicitly voiced support for any theory where Egyptians were Caucasian with a dark pigmentation." The current position of modern scholarship is that the Egyptian civilization was an indigenous Nile Valley development (see population history of Egypt).

Caucasian / Hamitic hypothesis 

The Caucasian hypothesis, which has been rejected by mainstream scholarship, is the hypothesis that the Nile valley "was originally peopled by a branch of the Caucasian race". It was proposed in 1844 by Samuel George Morton, who acknowledged that Negroes were present in ancient Egypt but claimed they were either captives or servants. George Gliddon (1844) wrote: "Asiatic in their origin .... the Egyptians were white men, of no darker hue than a pure Arab, a Jew, or a Phoenician."

The similar Hamitic hypothesis, which has been rejected by mainstream scholarship, developed directly from the Asiatic Race Theory, and argued that the Ethiopid and Arabid populations of the Horn of Africa were the inventors of agriculture and had brought all civilization to Africa. It asserted that these people were Caucasians, not Negroid. It also rejected any Biblical basis despite using Hamitic as the theory's name. Charles Gabriel Seligman in his Some Aspects of the Hamitic Problem in the Anglo-Egyptian Sudan (1913) and later works argued that the ancient Egyptians were among this group of Caucasian Hamites, having arrived in the Nile Valley during early prehistory and introduced technology and agriculture to primitive natives they found there.

The Italian anthropologist Giuseppe Sergi (1901) believed that ancient Egyptians were the Eastern African (Hamitic) branch of the Mediterranean race, which he called "Eurafrican". According to Sergi, the Mediterranean race or "Eurafrican" contains three varieties or sub-races: the African (Hamitic) branch, the Mediterranean "proper" branch and the Nordic (depigmented) branch. Sergi maintained in summary that the Mediterranean race (excluding the depigmented Nordic or 'white') is: "a brown human variety, neither white nor Negroid, but pure in its elements, that is to say not a product of the mixture of Whites with Negroes or Negroid peoples".

Grafton Elliot Smith modified the theory in 1911, stating that the ancient Egyptians were a dark haired "brown race", most closely "linked by the closest bonds of racial affinity to the Early Neolithic populations of the North African littoral and South Europe", and not Negroid. Smith's "brown race" is not synonymous or equivalent with Sergi's Mediterranean race. The Hamitic Hypothesis was still popular in the 1960s and late 1970s and was supported notably by Anthony John Arkell and George Peter Murdock.

At the UNESCO "Symposium on the Peopling of Ancient Egypt and the Deciphering of the Meroitic Script" in Cairo in 1974, none of the participants explicitly voiced support for any theory where Egyptians were Caucasian with a dark pigmentation." The current position of modern scholarship is that the Egyptian civilization was an indigenous Nile Valley development (see population history of Egypt).

Turanid race hypothesis 
The Turanid race hypothesis, which has been rejected by mainstream scholarship, is the hypothesis that the ancient Egyptians belonged to the Turanid race, linking them to the Tatars.

It was proposed by Egyptologist Samuel Sharpe in 1846, who was "inspired" by some ancient Egyptian paintings, which depict Egyptians with sallow or yellowish skin. He said "From the colour given to the women in their paintings we learn that their skin was yellow, like that of the Mongul Tartars, who have given their name to the Mongolian variety of the human race.... The single lock of hair on the young nobles reminds us also of the Tartars."

The current position of modern scholarship is that the Egyptian civilization was an indigenous Nile Valley development (see population history of Egypt).

Dynastic race theory 

The Dynastic race theory, which has been rejected by modern scholarship, is the hypothesis that a Mesopotamian force had invaded Egypt in predynastic times, imposed itself on the indigenous Badarian people, and become their rulers. The Mesopotamian-founded state or states were supposed to have conquered both Upper and Lower Egypt and founded the First Dynasty of Egypt.

The theory was proposed in the early 20th century by Flinders Petrie, who deduced that skeletal remains found at pre-dynastic sites at Naqada (Upper Egypt) indicated the presence of two different races, with one race differentiated physically by a noticeably larger skeletal structure and cranial capacity. Petrie also noted new architectural styles—the distinctly Mesopotamian "niched-façade" architecture—pottery styles, cylinder seals and a few artworks, as well as numerous predynastic rock and tomb paintings depicting Mesopotamian style boats, symbols, and figures. Based on plentiful cultural evidence, Petrie concluded that the invading ruling elite was responsible for the seemingly sudden rise of Egyptian civilization. In the 1950s, the dynastic race theory was widely accepted.

While there is clear evidence the Naqada II culture borrowed abundantly from Mesopotamia, the Naqada II period had a large degree of continuity with the Naqada I period, and the changes which did happen during the Naqada periods happened over significant amounts of time. The most commonly held view today is that the achievements of the First Dynasty were the result of a long period of cultural and political development, and the current position of modern scholarship is that the Egyptian civilization was an indigenous Nile Valley development.

The Senegalese Egyptologist Cheikh Anta Diop fought against the dynastic race theory with his own "Black Egyptian" theory and claimed, among other things, that Eurocentric scholars supported the dynastic race theory "to avoid having to admit that Ancient Egyptians were black". Martin Bernal proposed that the dynastic race theory was conceived by European scholars to deny Egypt its African roots.

Reactions in modern Egypt 
In 2023, American comedian Kevin Hart's planned tour of Egypt was cancelled, after an uproar on Egyptian social media over Afrocentric claims made by Hart about Egyptian history. Zahi Hawass also interceded into the controversy and accused international figures of African descent such as Hart who promoted Afrocentrism of racism and falsifying Egyptian history. Hawass had also affirmed that "No Africans built the pyramids because Kushites didn't exist at the period when the pyramids were built" and dismissed the "notions that Egyptians are Black Africans despite our presence in Africa".

See also 
 Biological anthropology
 Demographics of Egypt
 DNA history of Egypt
 Dynastic race theory
 Egyptomania
 Genetic history of the Middle East
 Hamitic hypothesis
 History of anthropology
 Indo-Aryan Migration controversy

Notes

References

Sources 

 : later part of Black Athena Revisited, 1996
 
 
 
 
 
 
 
 
 
 
 
 
 
 
 
 
 
 
 
 . Reprinted with revisions as part of the essay collection Black Athena Revisited, 1996
 
 
 
 
 
 
 
 
 "Ptolemaic Dynasty Affiliates". www.tyndalehouse.com. Archived from the original on 2011-07-16. Retrieved 2017-06-09

External links

 
African and Black nationalism
Race
Fringe theories
Historical revisionism
Politics and race
Pseudohistory
Race (human categorization)
Scientific controversies
Mizraim